Syalapakha  is a village development committee in Eastern Rukum District in Lumbini Province of western Nepal. At the time of the 1991 Nepal census it had a population of 5433 people living in 1160 individual households.

References

Populated places in Eastern Rukum District